Red Nightmare is the best-known title of the 1962 Armed Forces Information Film (AFIF) 120, Freedom and You. The short film was produced to mold public opinion against communism. The film was later released to American television and as an educational film to American schools under the Red Nightmare title.

The film is a Cold War-era drama short subject directed by George Waggner, narrated by Jack Webb and starring Jack Kelly and Jeanne Cooper. Though made for the Department of Defense, it was shown on American television on Jack Webb's GE True in 1962.

Plot
In a typical American town, barbed wire, barricades and soldiers in Soviet uniforms are shown. Narrator Jack Webb explains that there are several places behind the Iron Curtain used for training Soviet espionage and sabotage forces prior to infiltrating America.

The Donovans are a typical American family consisting of father Jerry, mother Helen and daughter Linda, whose boyfriend Bill has been invited to dinner. Jerry is missing a PTA meeting to go bowling, and he intends to skip his Army Reserve training, which upsets Helen. Linda and Bill inform Jerry and Helen that they wish to marry, but Jerry replies they are too young and should wait five years.

Jerry awakens to find meetings in the public square about infiltrating America to bring down capitalism. He returns home to find his daughter going to a farm collective escorted by Bill, who is now in a Soviet Army uniform. Helen informs Jerry that he will have to address the PTA on the glories of communism, which Jerry refuses to do, but his wife says that he has no choice. At work, Jerry's foreman tells him that he has not met his quota and must work through the lunch break to meet it.

On Sunday morning, Jerry wakes to find his two youngest children being sent to a state-run communist school against his wishes. He insists that the children attend Sunday school and takes them to their church, which has been converted into a museum glorifying the Soviet Union, including many inventions made by Americans that the Soviets claim to have invented. Jerry knocks the exhibits over and is arrested by troops led by a commissar.

Jerry is brought to trial at a Soviet tribunal, where there is no jury nor defense attorney. Jerry demands to know the charge against him. After condemning testimony from several witnesses, including his own wife, Jerry is convicted and sentenced to death. When he is strapped into the execution chair, Jerry makes a speech about the Soviet people awakening one day to overthrow communism before he is shot in the head by the commissar (offscreen).

Jerry wakes to his freedoms and apologizes to Bill and Linda. Bill says that Jerry was right about waiting to get married and that he and Linda will do so after he finishes his enlistment in the United States Army.

Cast
 Jack Kelly as Jerry Donavan
 Jeanne Cooper as Helen Donavan
 Peter Brown as Bill Martin
 Pat Woodell as Linda Donavan (as Patricia Woodell)
 Andrew Duggan as Judge
 Peter Breck as Russian Officer
 Robert Conrad as Pete
 Mike Road as Prosecutor
 Jack Webb as On-Camera Narrator

Production
The film's production is similar to that of episodes of The Twilight Zone. It was made by Warner Bros. under the auspices of the Department of Defense Directorate of Armed Forces Information and Education under the direct supervision of Jack L. Warner.

Webb described the nightmare part of the film as the dramatization of a variety of stories told by refugees from Eastern Europe who fled the Soviet expansion following World War II.

The film features stars of Warner Bros. Television shows of the time. Jack Kelly was the co-lead of Maverick, and other cast members appeared in Warner Bros. shows that aired on the ABC network.

A stock shot of the union picnic scene from Warner Bros.' The Pajama Game is included in the film.

Video releases

Rhino Video released the film on videocassette in 1985 under the title The Commies Are Coming, the Commies Are Coming.

See also
 List of American films of 1962

References

External links

 

1962 films
1962 drama films
1960s short documentary films
American anti-communist propaganda shorts
American black-and-white films
Cold War films
Films directed by George Waggner
Mark VII Limited films
Warner Bros. short films
1960s English-language films
1960s American films